Atherton Island is a small island in the Sacramento–San Joaquin River Delta. It is in unincorporated San Joaquin County, California, part of Stockton. It appears on a 2015 USGS map of the area.

References

Islands of San Joaquin County, California
Islands of the Sacramento–San Joaquin River Delta
Islands of Northern California